Sandro Tomić (born 29 October 1972 in Split) is a Croatian football goalkeeper and currently the goalkeeping coach. Tomić previously played for Hajduk Split and NK Zagreb in the Prva HNL. He was a member of the 1995 Hajduk team which became Croatian champions, as well as becoming Hungarian champion with Debrecen in 2005 and 2006 and winning two Supercups, while with Honved he won Hungarian Cup.

On 21 August 2007 Tomić signed a contract with newly formed Iranian side PAS Hamedan F.C.

He was supposed to play for Croatia in World Cup 1998. He was already on the list of Miroslav Blažević, but Tomić injured his shoulder before the championship.

Sandro Tomić never made it to play in Hajduk's first team like basic goalkeeper, but he played around 14 official games for Hajduk, since he was playing at the same time when Tonći Gabrić and Zoran Slavica were Hajduk's goalkeepers.

His son Fabjan Tomić is also goalkeeper of Hajduk Split.

Managerial career 
In March 2019, the Football Federation of Turkmenistan named Tomiç as the goalkeeper coach of the Turkmenistan national football team. The contract is signed for 1 year. Croatian specialist Sandro Tomic will help Ante Miše in the national team of Turkmenistan. Croatian coaches are set to develop the overall football in Turkmenistan, not just the national team.

In March 2020, due to the expiration of the contract and the postponement of the matches of the 2022 FIFA World Cup qualification in Asia, he left Turkmenistan alongside head coach Ante Miše. The national team of Turkmenistan, playing in the qualifying tournament of the World Cup 2022, has occupied first place in the group at the time of his departure.

References

External links
 

1972 births
Living people
Footballers from Split, Croatia
Association football goalkeepers
Croatian footballers
NK Primorac 1929 players
HNK Hajduk Split players
NK Istra players
NK Zagreb players
Debreceni VSC players
Budapest Honvéd FC players
Pas players
NK Imotski players
Nea Salamis Famagusta FC players
Croatian Football League players
Nemzeti Bajnokság I players
Cypriot First Division players
Croatian expatriate footballers
Expatriate footballers in Hungary
Croatian expatriate sportspeople in Hungary
Expatriate footballers in Iran
Croatian expatriate sportspeople in Iran
Expatriate footballers in Cyprus
Croatian expatriate sportspeople in Cyprus
Association football goalkeeping coaches
HNK Hajduk Split non-playing staff
Galatasaray S.K. (football) non-playing staff
Croatian expatriate sportspeople in Turkey
Croatian expatriate sportspeople in Turkmenistan